Elaphidion curacaoae is a species of beetle in the family Cerambycidae. It was described by Gilmour in 1968.

References

curacaoae
Beetles of North America
Insects of the Caribbean
Beetles described in 1968